Go International is a Target Corporation store brand that focuses on affordable apparel and accessories for women. Each season is created by a different designer who is already well known for their high-end collections and is only available for 90 days from its release.

Designers
Fiorucci (December 2005)
Luella Bartley (January 2006)
Tara Jarmon (May 2006)
Paul & Joe by Sophie Albou (August 2006)
Behnaz Sarafpour (November 2006)
Proenza Schouler (February 2007)
Patrick Robinson (May 2007)
Libertine (July 2007)
Alice Temperley (September 2007)
Erin Fetherston (November 2007)
Jovovich-Hawk (March 2008)
Rogan (May 2008)
Richard Chai (August 2008)
Jonathan Saunders (October 2008)
Thakoon Panichgul (December 2008)
McQ by Alexander McQueen (March 2009)
Tracy Feith (May 2009)
Anna Sui (September 2009)
Rodarte (December 2009)
Jean Paul Gaultier (March 2010)
Zac Posen (April 2010)
William Rast (December 2010)
Calypso St. Barth (June 2011)
Missoni (September 2011)
Jason Wu (February 2012)
Neiman Marcus Holiday collection (December 2012)
Prabal Gurung (February 2013)
Phillip Lim (September 2013)
Peter Pilotto (February 2014)
TOMS (November 2014)
Lilly Pulitzer (April 2015)
Eddie Borgo (June 2015)
Adam Lippes (August 2015) Announced
Marimekko (April 2016)
Victoria Beckham (April 2017)

External links
 Official site

Clothing brands
Target Corporation